Naria eburnea, common name ivory cowry, is a species of sea snail, a cowry, a marine gastropod mollusk in the family Cypraeidae, the cowries.

Description
Naria eburnea has a shell reaching a size of about 35–45 mm [1.38–1.77 inches]. The coloration of this shell is light white. In the living cowries, the mantle is brown or greyish, with paler finger-like projections.

Distribution
This species can be found in the South Pacific Ocean, as far north as Palau, and as far east as Fiji.

References

External links
 Natural History Museum of Rotterdam : photo
 Encyclopedia of Life
 Underwaterkwaj
 Cypraea.eu
 Flmnh

Cypraeidae
Gastropods described in 1824